Carlos Alberto Peña Rodríguez (born 29 March 1990), sometimes known as Gullit, is a Mexican professional footballer who plays as a midfielder for UAE First Division League club Al Dhaid SC.

Club career

Pachuca
Born in Ciudad Victoria, Tamaulipas, Peña graduated from C.F. Pachuca's youth categories, and mad his first-team debut on 14 April 2010, coming on as a late substitute in a 2–2 away draw against Cruz Azul. He appeared more regularly in the following campaign, playing 19 matches (13 as a starter).

León
In May 2011, Peña joined Ascenso MX side Club León. He appeared in 31 matches during his first campaign with Los Panzas Verdes, as the club was promoted from the play-offs. In 2013–14 Peña scored 12 goals, as León was crowned champions of both Apertura and Clausura tournaments (the latter by defeating his former club Pachuca).

Guadalajara
On 6 December 2015, C.D. Guadalajara announced they had signed Peña with a reported transfer fee of US$8 million. Peña scored on his official debut against Veracruz on 10 January 2016. Despite a slow start to the Clausura 2016 season, Peña scored seven goals in 17 appearances. However, he has received criticism for his missed penalties during crucial games.

Return to León (loan)
On 7 December 2016, it was announced that Peña had returned to Leon after playing a year for Guadalajara.

Rangers
On 22 June 2017, Scottish club Rangers announced the signing of Peña on a three-year contract for a fee of £3.2m. Peña scored his first Rangers goal in a 4–1 win over Dundee on 9 September. After two loan spells back in Mexico, his contract with Rangers was terminated in February 2019.

GKS Tychy
In March 2019 Peña moved,  to GKS Tychy.

International career
In late 2012, Peña was called up by José Manuel de la Torre to play for Mexico in the World Cup Qualifiers against Guyana on 12 October and El Salvador on 16 October. He was also called up for a friendly against Peru.

Peña was named among the 23-man squad for the 2013 Gold Cup. Mexico was eventually knocked out in the semifinals by runners-up Panama, with Peña appearing in four matches during the competition. He was later called up by Víctor Manuel Vucetich to the 2014 FIFA World Cup Qualifying matches against Panama and Costa Rica. He scored his first international goal against Finland in a friendly match on 30 October 2013. Peña was named in the 23 squad men in the 2014 World Cup. He played in the final group stage match against Croatia replacing Oribe Peralta.

Career statistics

Club

International

Scores and results list Mexico's goal tally first, score column indicates score after each Peña goal.

Honours
León
Liga MX: Apertura 2013, Clausura 2014
Ascenso MX: Clausura 2012

Guadalajara
Supercopa MX: 2016

Necaxa
Supercopa MX: 2018

FAS
Salvadoran Primera División: Clausura 2021

References

External links
 
 
 
 
 
 
 

1990 births
Living people
Mexican footballers
Footballers from Tamaulipas
Association football midfielders
C.F. Pachuca players
Club León footballers
C.D. Guadalajara footballers
Rangers F.C. players
Cruz Azul footballers
GKS Tychy players
Liga MX players
Scottish Professional Football League players
Mexico international footballers
2013 CONCACAF Gold Cup players
2014 FIFA World Cup players
Copa América Centenario players
Mexican expatriate footballers
Expatriate footballers in Scotland
Expatriate footballers in Poland
Mexican expatriate sportspeople in Scotland
Mexican expatriate sportspeople in Poland